Worlds Away is the fourth and most successful album by the California soft rock group Pablo Cruise. The album charted higher than any other of the band's albums, reaching #6 in the United States. Three singles were released from the album: "Love Will Find a Way", "Don't Want to Live Without It" and "I Go to Rio", reaching #6, #21, and #46 respectively. The title track, "Worlds Away" was not released as a single, but remains a favorite among many fans of the band today.

Before the album was recorded, original bassist Bud Cockrell left the band and was replaced by Bruce Day.

Track listing

Side One
"Worlds Away" (Lerios, Day, Bob Brown) - 3:45
"Love Will Find a Way" (Jenkins, Lerios) - 4:11
"Family Man" (Jenkins, Lerios) - 4:58
"Runnin'" (Jenkins, Lerios) - 6:30

Side Two
"Don't Want to Live Without It" (Jenkins, Lerios) - 4:37
"You're Out to Lose" (Jenkins, Lerios, Michael McDonald) - 3:28
"Always Be Together" (Jenkins, Lerios) - 5:01
"Sailing to Paradise" (Jenkins, Lerios, David Batteau) - 3:26
"I Go to Rio" (Peter Allen, Adrienne Anderson) - 3:59

Charts

Personnel
Pablo Cruise
David Jenkins - guitars, vocals
Steve Price - percussion, drums
Bruce Day - bass, vocals
Cory Lerios - piano, keyboards, synthesizers, backing vocals, programming
Sidemen
Steve Porcaro - synthesizers, programming
James Newton Howard - synthesizers, programming
Mike Porcaro - bass

Production
Bill Schnee: Producer, Engineer
Mike Reese: Mastering
Doug Sax: Mastering

References

Pablo Cruise albums
1978 albums
A&M Records albums
Albums produced by Bill Schnee